Club Atlético Los Andes is an Argentine sports club based in the Lomas de Zamora district of Greater Buenos Aires. The football team currently plays in the Primera B, the third division of the Argentine football league system.

The club was founded by a group of young people in 1917, and its name was chosen to commemorate the first balloon flight across the Andes mountain, which had happened in 1916.

Los Andes has had three runs in the Argentine Primera División: the first was in 1961, the second time was between the 1968 and 1971 Metropolitano championships. Los Andes best ever final position was an 8° position overall in 1968 Nacional.

The third run in Primera División was in 2000–01 and lasted only one season: Los Andes finished 19th out of 20 teams and was relegated to Primera B Nacional with the worst points average in the division.

After some seasons in the lower divisions, in 2014 Los Andes returned to B Nacional after winning a championship of the Primera B Metropolitana, but be relegated in the 2018–19 season.

Current squad

Honours

Primera B Metropolitana (2): 1960, 2014
Primera C (3): 1926, 1938, 1957

References

External links
Official website
Las voces Milrayitas
Lomas Locura
Vivo por Los Andes

L
Club Atlético Los Andes
L
L
l